French senators elected by the National Assembly held office during the French Fourth Republic.

The senators were:

 André Armengaud
 Antoine Avinin
 Jean-Richard Bloch
 Émile Bollaert
 Alice Brisset
 Gilberte Brossolette
 Alexandre Caspary
 Auguste Champetier de Ribes
 Joseph Chatagner
 André Debray
 Jules Decaux
 Pierre Delfortrie
 Marcel Renet
 Marcelle Devaud
 Juliette Dubois
 Yvonne Dumont
 Charles Flory
 Étienne Gilson
 Salomon Grumbach
 Amédée Guy
 Jules Hyvrard
 Aziz Kessous
 Xavier Knecht
 Emmanuel la Graviere
 Bernard Lafay
 Georges Laffargue
 Marie-Hélène Lefaucheux
 René Mammonat
 Faustin Merle
 Geoffroy de Montalembert
 Léon Nicod
 Abdelmadjid Ou Rabah
 Marie Oyon
 André Pairault
 Joseph Paul-Boncour
 Ernest Petit
 Ernest Pezet
 René Poirot
 Jean Primet
 Alex Roubert
 Claire Saunier
 Robert Serot
 Paul Simon
 Pierre Tremintin
 Paul Tubert
 Christian Vieljeux
 Marcel Willard

References

Sources